Jan Grøndahl (born 12 July 1934) is a Norwegian police chief and civil servant.

He was born in Oslo, and took the cand.jur. degree. After spending the years 1972 to 1977 as chief of police in Sør-Varanger, he served as Governor of Svalbard from 1978 to 1982 and chief of police in Hamar from 1982 to 1998—except for the years 1991 to 1993, when he was acting director of the Norwegian Police Surveillance Agency.

References

1934 births
Living people
Norwegian police chiefs
Governors of Svalbard
Directors of government agencies of Norway